Harry Potter and the Prisoner of Azkaban is a 2004 action-adventure video game. The game is based on the 2004 film of the same name from the Harry Potter franchise. The game was developed by KnowWonder, Griptonite Games, and EA UK each for different consoles and was published by Electronic Arts under the EA Games label. The game was released as a trio, with separate versions for Game Boy Advance, Microsoft Windows, and home consoles (released on PlayStation 2, Xbox, and  GameCube). The game received mixed reviews by critics.

Plot

The games follows Harry Potter (voiced by Tom Attenborough and Harry Robinson) along with Ron Weasley (voiced by Gregg Chillin) and Hermione Granger (voiced by Harper Marshall) as they return to Hogwarts School of Witchcraft and Wizardry. Prisoner Sirius Black has escaped the wizard prison Azkaban, and is supposedly ready to attack Harry in Hogwarts. The game begins on the Hogwarts Express, ignoring the events at Harry's home. Upon reaching Hogwarts, the trio follow the events of the novel, and learn magic by attending classes.

The spells that can be learned include carpe retractum, a spell that allows an object to be pulled towards the caster, or the caster be pulled towards the object; Steleus, a spell that causes sneezing and expecto patronum, a spell to defend against dementors. Using their skills, the trio, along with Remus Lupin (Jamie Glover) investigate Black. Finding that Black is innocent of all crimes, and looking out for Harry, the team defend Black from a horde of dementors, allowing him to escape.

Gameplay and versions
Similar to in Harry Potter and the Chamber of Secrets, different versions of this game were produced for the different platforms. The game was released for PC by KnowWonder, whereas home consoles (PlayStation 2 (PS2), Xbox and GameCube) by Electronic Arts UK (EA), and a handheld version by Griptonite Games for the Game Boy Advance (GBA). However, all games were published by EA and Warner Bros. The game also differed between platforms; whilst the console release was a traditional 3D over the shoulder perspective, featuring boss fights and detective sections, the PC version featured similar puzzle solving missions as those in earlier versions. The Game Boy Advance release played as a traditional Role playing game, similar to games like Dragon Quest. The PlayStation 2 version features mini-games compatible with the EyeToy. In addition to playing as the titular character Harry, the game also allows the player to control Hermione and Ron, as well as fly Buckbeak, and control Harry's pet owl, Hedwig.

Reception

Harry Potter and the Prisoner of Azkaban received "mixed or average" reviews, according to video game review aggregator website Metacritic. GameSpot were positive about the game, scoring 7/10 or above across releases, with a high of 7.5 out of 10 for the GBA version. Frank Provo of GameSpot was very positive about the GBA game's recreation of the novel; saying "The main thing to keep in mind is that Prisoner of Azkaban on the GBA offers a fun way for Harry Potter fans to step into the shoes of their favorite wizard-in-training and experience firsthand everything that happened in the third installment of the series." GameZone also reviewed the Game Boy Advance version, calling it "a really fun romp in Harry's world! Fans should be well-pleased." IGN commented on the game not forcing "random battes" from similar RPGs as a positive, but saying that it wasn't "enough to make Prisoner of Azkaban a successful RPG. It's got a solid storyline based on the book and film, and dozens of quests that branch outwards from situations from the film ... but the experience is hindered slightly, simply by sloppy implementation of standard gaming elements."

Matt Casamassina of IGN reviewed the PS2 version of the game. He gave the game a 6.2 rating out of 10, saying "In some cases, it's prettier than any other "Boy Wizard" game. In some cases, it's smarter. As a long-time Potter fan who has read all of the books and watched every movie, I've always been particularly interested in this chapter of the franchise. And this game does deliver a good amount of compelling story and play. I especially enjoyed the multi-character-based puzzles and the new spells that Harry, Ron and Hermione can cast, all of them useful for different reasons." However, Casamassina also called the game "Sloppy", and criticised the somewhat unpredictable framerate, before concluding "Potter fans who can deal with the drawbacks will find an entertaining experience hiding. But everyone else should steer clear of this game."

Brad Shoemaker of GameSpot reviewed the PC version, but called it "easy" before saying "One, any player of even marginal skill will finish the game in five to six hours, and two, its puzzles and combat are both remarkably easy. Those facts make Prisoner of Azkaban a great game for younger kids, and it's a lot of fun for less-discriminating older fans of Harry Potter too. The game may be short and easy, but it's also thoughtfully designed and genuinely entertaining, and KnowWonder deserves credit for that." Tim Wapshott of The Times gave the game a score of four stars out of five and stated, "The game remains faithful to the spirit of the book, but it is perhaps a little too linear and predictable. Some scenes do not look quite right – the scale of the characters against the width of the Hogwarts Express clearly do not tally. But these minor disappointments are quickly outweighed by stunning visuals in the later levels. While older teenagers may snub this Harry Potter outing, there's still good mileage in the bespectacled chappie for younger players."

In the United States, the game sold 1.03 million units by 2006.

Notes

References

External links
 
 
 

2004 video games
Amaze Entertainment games
Electronic Arts games
EyeToy games
Fiction about prison escapes
Game Boy Advance games
GameCube games
Games with GameCube-GBA connectivity
Griptonite Games
Harry Potter 3
PlayStation 2 games
RenderWare games
Single-player video games
Unreal Engine games
Video game sequels
Video games based on adaptations
Video games developed in the United Kingdom
Video games developed in the United States
Video games scored by Jeremy Soule
Video games set in 1993
Video games set in 1994
Video games set in castles
Video games set in Scotland
Video games set in the 1990s
Video games with alternative versions
Warner Bros. video games
Windows games
Xbox games